JDS Yaeshio (SS-572) was the seventh boat of thes. She was commissioned on 7 March 1978.

Construction and career
Takashio was laid down at Kawasaki Heavy Industries Kobe Shipyard on 14 April 1975 and launched on 19 May 1977. She was commissioned on 7 March 1978, into the 1st Submarine Group.

Participated in Hawaii dispatch training from January 19 to April 22, 1982.

On 14 August 1994, she was reclassified as an auxiliary submarine, her hull number was changed to ATSS-8005, and she became a ship under the direct control of the 1st Submarine Group.

She was decommissioned on 1 August 1996.

Citations

1977 ships
Uzushio-class submarines
Ships built by Kawasaki Heavy Industries